Than Phu Ying Boonruen Choonhavan (née Sophot; ; ; 25 April 1920 – 14 August 2021) was a Thai socialite who was the wife of Chatichai Choonhavan, Prime Minister of Thailand and a relative of the Queen Mother Srinagarindra.

Life
Chatichai and Boonruen had two children, daughter Wanee Hongpraphas, and their son political scientist, social activist, and former senator Kraisak Choonhavan.

Boonruen and all her siblings were sponsored by Princess Srinagarindra and were followers when the Princess and her families traveled to Lausanne, Switzerland by boat from Penang in April 1933 with Princess Galyani Vadhana, King Ananda Mahidol and Prince Bhumibol Adulyadej. Later, Princess Srinagarindra arranged for her to live with a Swiss family and went on to study at a boarding school for girls. Boonruen graduated in child-rearing and accompanied Princess Srinagarindra back to Thailand in November 1938 and became a teacher at Laor Uthit Demonstration Kindergarten School Suan Dusit Institution.

Death
Boonruen died in Bangkok of COVID-19 on 14 August 2021, at the age of 101.

References

1920 births
2021 deaths
Boonruen Choonhavan
Boonruen Choonhavan
Deaths from the COVID-19 pandemic in Thailand
Boonruen Choonhavan
Women centenarians